Pelidnota burmeisteri is a species of beetles of the family Scarabaeidae.

Description

Distribution
This species occurs in Brazil.

References
 Universal Biological Indexer
 Zipcodezoo

Scarabaeidae
Beetles described in 1844